Albertino Barisoni (died 14 August 1667) was a Roman Catholic prelate who served as Bishop of Ceneda (1653–1667).

Biography
Albertino Barisoni was born in Padua, on September 7, 1587. His noble family was native to Vigonza, a village next to Padua.

Barisoni began his humanistic education at Padua and, after manifesting a talent and inclination for ecclesiastic life, was sent to Rome to pursue the study of philosophy. In Rome, he became a member of the clergy. He returned to Padua in 1610 as a canon of the cathedral and there continued his studies. He graduated in philosophy on February 8, 1605, at the age of seventeen. Afterward, he continued his education by studying law.

In 1614, Barisoni went to Rome in the company of Paolo Gualdo to solve some curial questions and afterward (at an indeterminable date) was appointed to an abbacy in Germany. However, he returned to Rome because he found the climate uncongenial. Having resigned his position as a canon when named an abbot, upon his return to Padua, he retired to his family estate at Vigonza and devoted himself to study.

During his stay in Rome, Barisoni wrote poetry. He was one of the most illustrious members of the Accademia Galileiana, under the pseudonym “Stentato”. On March 1619 he became “principe” of the Accademia. He was also a member of the Venetian Accademia degli Incogniti. In 1622, he edited and published, with a commentary, the work of his friend, the poet Alessandro Tassoni, entitled La secchia rapita.

On 23 November 1653, Barisoni was appointed during the papacy of Pope Innocent X as Bishop of Ceneda. He served as Bishop of Ceneda until his death on 14 August 1667.

References

External links and additional sources
 
  (for Chronology of Bishops) 
  (for Chronology of Bishops) 

17th-century Italian Roman Catholic bishops
Bishops appointed by Pope Innocent X
1667 deaths